Trap or Die 3 is the ninth studio album by American rapper Jeezy. It was released on October 28, 2016, by CTE World and Def Jam Recordings. The album features guest appearances from Yo Gotti, Bankroll Fresh, French Montana, Lil Wayne, Plies and Chris Brown. The album was supported by two official singles: "Let Em Know" and "All There" featuring Bankroll Fresh.

Singles
The album's first single, "Let Em Know", was released on September 9, 2016. The album's second single, "All There" featuring Bankroll Fresh, was released on October 6, 2016.

Critical reception

Trap or Die 3 received generally positive reviews from critics. At Metacritic, which assigns a normalized rating out of 100 to reviews from mainstream publications, the album received an average score of 70, based on five reviews.

Andy Kellman of AllMusic said that on the album "Jeezy doesn't say much that deviates from previous ice-veined rhymes, but he attacks just about every track with intense focus and ferocity". HipHopDX reviewer Ural Garrett said that "Pretty Diamonds" is the best track of the album, but felt that the album was below expectations, saying: "Jeezy is better than Trap or Die 3 and he knows it".

Commercial performance
Trap or Die 3 debuted at number one on the Billboard 200, earning 89,000 album-equivalent units, of which 73,000 were pure album sales. It became Jeezy's third number-one album.

Track listing

Charts

Weekly charts

Year-end charts

Certifications

References

2016 albums
Albums produced by Mike Will Made It
Albums produced by Shawty Redd
Jeezy albums
Def Jam Recordings albums
Sequel albums